Karapitiya is a suburb of Galle in the Southern Province of Sri Lanka. It is located within the limits of Galle Four Gravets.

Local facilities
Karapitiya has the Karapitiya Teaching Hospital, a notable tertiary care hospital in the country, which serves as the main clinical training institute Faculty of Medicine of University of Ruhuna.  

There are a number of roads in Karapitiya, including the Hirimbura Cross Road, Anagarika Dharmapala Mawatha (Browns Road), Peter Kiringoda Mawatha, Maitipe First, Second and Third lanes, Hirimbura Road, H. K. Edmand Road (Morris Road) and Labuduwa Road.

Recently It has achieved a fast development with newly established branches of all of the famous banks in Sri Lanka;
 Bank of Ceylon
 People's Bank
 Sampath Bank
 Hatton National Bank
 Nations Trust Bank
 Commercial Bank of Ceylon
 Sanasa Development Bank
 Regional Development Bank 
 Seylan Bank

Supermarkets;
 Cargills Food City
 Abeywickrama Food City [AFC]
 Keells Super

Lifestyle Showroom ;

Electro Enterprises

Religious places and History
The temple which is known as Purana Sunandaramaya is situated in front of the hospital. Sri Sudharmaramaya is a famous ancient temple located at Maitipe, Karapitiya. Sri Dheerananada Dhamma School located there serves the society.

Public Transport

Bus Services
There are several routes heading to/from Galle to/from Karapitiya and also via Karapitiya.

References

External links
Galle Four Gravets Divisional Secretariat

Populated places in Sri Lanka
Suburbs of Galle